This is a list of flags used in Bosnia and Herzegovina. For more information about the national flag, visit the article Flag of Bosnia and Herzegovina.

National flag

Subnational flags

Entities

Districts

Military flags

Cantons of the Federation

Former flags of the Cantons of the Federation

Political flags

Ethnic groups flags

Historical national flags

Proposed flags

Proposals for the Socialist Republic of Bosnia and Herzegovina

Proposals before Dayton Agreement

First set of proposals

Second set of proposals

Third set of proposals

See also
 Flag of Bosnia and Herzegovina – main article on the Bosnian and Herzegovinian national flag
 Coat of arms of Bosnia and Herzegovina
 Flag of the Federation of Bosnia and Herzegovina

References

Bosnia and Herzegovina
 List
Flags